Forsterygion is a genus of triplefins in the family Tripterygiidae native to coastal New Zealand, but also introduced to Tasmania, Australia.

Species
The following species are classified in this genus:
 Spotted robust triplefin, Forsterygion capito 
 Yellow-and-black triplefin, Forsterygion flavonigrum Fricke & Roberts, 1994
 Tasmanian robust triplefin, Forsterygion gymnotum
 Common triplefin, Forsterygion lapillum Hardy, 1989 
 Mottled triplefin, Forsterygion malcolmi Hardy, 1987
 Oblique-swimming triplefin, Forsterygion maryannae
 Estuarine triplefin, Forsterygion nigripenne
 Striped triplefin, Forsterygion varium (Forster, 1801)

Etymology

References

 
Marine fish genera
Tripterygiidae